is a Japanese professional racing cyclist, who rides for UCI Women's WorldTeam .

Yonamine only switched from tennis to cycling when in college at Tsukuba University, and quickly achieved success in Japan, coming in second in both the Japanese National Road Race Championships and the Japanese National Time Trial Championships in 2012 at age 21. The next year, she won both the national road race and time trial championships. In the spring of 2016, she signed a short-term contract with the American UCI team , and later repeated her victory in the national time trial. Yonamine was selected to represent Japan in the 2016 Summer Olympics.

Major results
Source: 

2012
 National Road Championships
2nd Road race
2nd Time trial
2013
 National Road Championships
1st  Road race
1st  Time trial
 2nd National Cyclo-cross Championships
 8th Road race, Asian Road Championships
2014
 1st  Cross-country, National Mountain Bike Championships
 2nd  Time trial, Asian Road Championships
 National Road Championships
2nd Road race
2nd Time trial
2015
 National Road Championships
1st  Time trial
2nd Road race
2016
 National Road Championships
1st  Road race
1st  Time trial
 4th Road race, Asian Road Championships
 5th Overall Tour Cycliste Féminin International de l'Ardèche
 7th Overall Joe Martin Stage Race
 7th Overall Trophée d'Or Féminin
 7th Chrono des Nations
 9th Overall Tour of the Gila
2017
 National Road Championships
1st  Road race
1st  Time trial
  Combativity award Stage 2, Holland Ladies Tour
2018
 National Road Championships
1st  Road race
1st  Time trial
 Asian Games
2nd  Time trial
3rd  Road race
2019
 National Road Championships
1st  Road race
1st  Time trial
 6th Overall Women's Tour of Scotland
2022
 2nd Road race, National Road Championships

References

External links

1991 births
Living people
Japanese female cyclists
Cyclists at the 2016 Summer Olympics
Cyclists at the 2020 Summer Olympics
Olympic cyclists of Japan
Asian Games medalists in cycling
Medalists at the 2018 Asian Games
Cyclists at the 2018 Asian Games
Asian Games silver medalists for Japan
Asian Games bronze medalists for Japan
20th-century Japanese women
21st-century Japanese women